Presidential elections were held in South Vietnam on 9 April 1961. The result was a victory for Ngô Đình Diệm, who won 89% of the vote.

Results

References

South Vietnam
Elections in South Vietnam
Presidential elections in Vietnam
Presidential election
April 1961 events in Asia
Election and referendum articles with incomplete results